The North Creek Trail is a regional multipurpose trail that runs from Bothell to Mill Creek in Washington state. Portions of the trail are still being developed.

References

External links
 North Creek Regional Trail. Snohomish County Government.
 North Creek Trail. City of Bothell.

Hiking trails in Washington (state)